The 2002 Syracuse Orangemen football team represented Syracuse University during the 2002 NCAA Division I-A football season. The Orange were coached by Paul Pasqualoni and played their home games at the Carrier Dome in Syracuse, New York.

Schedule

Roster

Team players in the NFL

References

Syracuse
Syracuse Orange football seasons
Syracuse Orangemen football